John Latta (March 2, 1836 – February 15, 1913) was an American lawyer and politician from Pennsylvania who served as the first lieutenant governor of Pennsylvania from 1875 to 1879. He also served as a Democratic member of the Pennsylvania House of Representatives from 1872 to 1873 and the Pennsylvania Senate from 1863 to 1866.

Early life and education
Latta was born in Unity Township, Pennsylvania, to Moses and Eliza (Graham) Latta. He was educated at Sewickley Academy and Elder's Ridge Academy. He read law under D.H. Hazen in Pittsburgh, entered Yale Law School in 1857 and graduated in 1859.  He was admitted to the Westmoreland County bar in 1859 and opened a law firm in Greensburg, Pennsylvania.  In 1865, he married Emma Hope and together they had 4 children.

Career
He served as a member of the Pennsylvania Senate for the 22nd district 1863 to 1864 and for the 23rd district from 1865 to 1866. He served as a member of the Pennsylvania House of Representatives from 1872 to 1873. Under the new Pennsylvania Constitution that went into effect on January 1, 1874, he was the first elected lieutenant governor and served under Republican Governor John Hartranft.

He died on February 15, 1913, in Greensburg, Pennsylvania, and was interred at St. Clair Cemetery.

References

External links
The Political Graveyard

|-

|-

1836 births
1913 deaths
19th-century American lawyers
19th-century American politicians
Burials in Pennsylvania
Lieutenant Governors of Pennsylvania
Democratic Party members of the Pennsylvania House of Representatives
Pennsylvania lawyers
Democratic Party Pennsylvania state senators
People from Greensburg, Pennsylvania
People from Westmoreland County, Pennsylvania
Sewickley Academy alumni
Yale Law School alumni